The Return of Jack Slade is a 1955 American western film directed by Harold D. Schuster and starring John Ericson, Mari Blanchard and Neville Brand. It is a loose sequel to the 1953 film Jack Slade.

Cast 
 John Ericson as Jack Slade, Jr.
 Mari Blanchard as Texas Rose
 Neville Brand as Harry Sutton
 Max Showalter as Billy Wilcox
 Jon Shepodd as Johnny Turner
 Howard Petrie as Joseph Ryan
 John Dennis as Kid Stanley
 Angie Dickinson as Polly Logan
 Donna Drew as	Laughing Sam
 Michael Ross as Little Blue Raven 
 Lyla Graham as 	Abilene
 Alan Wells as 	George Hagen
 Raymond Bailey as 	Professor

References

External links 

1955 Western (genre) films
Films scored by Paul Dunlap
1950s English-language films
1955 films
Allied Artists films
Films directed by Harold D. Schuster
American Western (genre) films
1950s American films
American black-and-white films